Linux Outlaws was a Linux news and technology podcast produced by Sixgun Productions and hosted by Fabian Scherschel and Dan Lynch. The show was based in the United Kingdom, and had a community forum as well as multiple social network accounts dedicated to fostering inter-communication among fans.

Presenters

Fabian Scherschel

Fabian Scherschel is a journalist at Heise Verlag in Hannover, Germany. He originally was a system administrator in Bonn. Later on he worked for a while for H-online in London. Fab also co-hosts a Warhammer 40,000 podcast, Angels of Death, with David Megins-Nicholas. Since December 2015 Fabian has been co-hosting Geek News Radio with David.

Dan Lynch
Dan Lynch is a programmer, musician, and producer from Merseyside, UK. He formerly worked for the NHS as a .NET developer before turning his back on Microsoft technologies to become an open source enthusiast.

Dan is an occasional co-host of FLOSS Weekly. In early 2010 Dan formed the band 20lb Sounds. He also produces the Free as in Freedom podcast

Format
Each episode generally had a global download count of over 20000 and was often presented with both a serious attitude and a humorous bent. Both Dan and Fabian are described as "down to earth, normal, everyday people" by listeners and reviewers alike. The presenters claimed not to be Linux experts, but only to be trying very hard to provide listeners with a good time, entertainment, and interesting Linux-related information.

Linux Outlaws was segment-based, and focused the show on discussion of various topics throughout the show. Regular features included News and Releases, a look at recent development in free culture and at new releases of Linux distributions and notable pieces of free software. Episode 43 saw the introduction of a Micro-watch sub-segment, concentrating on Microsoft-related news. The Linux Outlaws show aimed to broadcast live on YouTube most Monday nights (7 p.m. UTC), but they were always late.

In-Depth Topics and Listener Feedback included content from both presenters and listeners. Other segments included Tip of the Week and Beer of the Week, where Fabian recommended a brand of beer.

On occasion some shows were produced as specials to focus on one single topic, such as the release of Ubuntu 8.04 or an interview with Bradley M. Kuhn.

History
The first episode of Linux Outlaws was released on 5 September 2007. At the time both Dan and Fab were also hosting another Podcast Rathole radio. As Stefano Forenza says on his website "you know you're someone when you get cited twice in a single episode of LinuxOutlaws". Dan revived the name Rat Hole Radio as a music podcast in 2009.

Production
Linux Outlaws was recorded simultaneously by the presenters in their respective homes – Hanover and Merseyside, England – and published in both the Ogg Vorbis and MP3 formats. The process involved recordings made by each presenter on his own machine, as well as a backup analogue recording by Fabian. Recordings were usually made on Monday in a live show, using IRC and releases of the show usually occur on Wednesday. Some changes in schedule occurred when a special show is released, such as an interview.

Episodes

Linux Outlaws reached their 100th Episode on 6 July 2009.
 

They reached their 200th Episode on 10 April 2011.

They reached their 300th Episode on 17 February 2013.

Their 370th and final Episode was released on 29 December 2014.

References

Notes 

It also received mentions from several other related podcasts, such as LugRadio and The Linux Link Tech Show.

External links
 
 
 Fab, Linux Outlaws Podcaster – interview on the site of Fedora.

Technology podcasts
Creative Commons-licensed podcasts
2007 podcast debuts
Audio podcasts
British podcasts